Taiwanese photography is deeply rooted in the country's unique and rapidly changing history. Its early photography is often divided into two periods: Pre-Japanese from approximately 1858 to 1895, and an Era of Japanese Influence, from 1895 to 1945, the year the Japanese rule of Taiwan ended. Many photographs from the period during which Taiwan was under Japanese rule have been preserved as postcards. Much of the pre-Japanese era photography was conducted by foreign missionaries (such as Scottish Presbyterian minister John Thomson) and merchants.

Chang Tsai (張才), Deng Nan-guang (鄧南光) and Lee Ming-diao (李鳴鵰), collectively known as the "three swordsmen", are among the best known of the Taiwanese photographers who were active in the 1930s to 1950s. Chinese influence supplanted Japanese influence when the Nationalist government's formally took over Taiwan in 1945 and imposed its authoritarian rule. The lifting of martial law opened Taiwan's art scene, including its photography. Photographer Chang Tsang-tsang has said "the lifting of martial law and the repealing of bans on the establishment of newspapers and political parties in the late 1980s stimulated the domestic art scene and supported the diversification of photography in Taiwan."
 
Photographers International is considered one of Taiwan's leading photography magazines in 1990s(discontinued in 2014). The magazine profiled key Taiwanese photographers such as Chang Yung-Chieh (張詠捷), Wu Chung-Wei (吳忠維), Hsieh Chun-Teh, (謝春德), Ho Ching-Tai (何經泰), Chuang Ling (莊靈), Liu Chen-Shan (劉振祥) and editor Juan I-Jong (阮義忠) in an issue called "Taiwan Vision".

Another well-known Taiwanese photographer is Taiwan-born Chien-Chi Chang (張乾琦), a member of the Magnum Photos agency.

Another important influence comes from photographer Chang Chao-Tang (張照堂), who is considered by many to be the most important photographer in Taiwan after World War II.

Bridal photography

Taiwanese bridal photography is a type of pre-wedding photography that is centered primarily in Taiwan but is also practiced in some of the surrounding nations. The photography includes many staged, heavily edited photographs that are meant to represent the bride at her most beautiful stage. The groom is also included in many of the photographs, but he is not the central focus, and his appearance is nowhere near as important as the bride's. It is an integral part of Taiwanese culture and almost every soon to be bride gets them done.
	One aspect of Taiwanese bridal photography that sets it apart from many other types of photography is the degree of glamorization that goes into creating the photographs. The bride will have her make-up applied by a professional artist to the point where she looks almost like a completely different individual. Some people claim that their friends are unrecognizable in their bridal photos. While brides are made-up and retouched, grooms are presented as looking the same as they would naturally look, either to avoid drawing attention away from the bride or to act as a foil to the bride's glamorous look. The outfits that the brides wear are much more diverse and plentiful than the classic white wedding dress. Brides will sometimes wear multiple styles of a white wedding dress over the course of a shoot, in addition to other more colorful dresses. 
	Bridal photos are not something that only the very rich or the very elite participate in, but they are a cultural institution that the majority of people actually participate in. This is not to say that bridal photography cannot indicate financial wealth or elite status. Most of the elite bridal salons are located in Taipei, and these elite bridal salons set the trends for some of the less recognized bridal salons in the cities. Urban bridal salons are usually considered to be more “stylish” and popular than the rural ones, which are usually less expensive. Rural bridal salons tend to be extravagant to the point of tackiness, while the urban salons set trends that mix the right amounts of both simplistic and extravagant ideas.

Process
The first step that the couple takes to get their bridal photographs is to visit a salon or a bridal fair where many salons have booths. They look at sample albums that day and then must choose their salon. The bride later returns to the chosen salon to hand-pick the dresses she will wear for the photo shoots and the dresses that she will rent for the banquets. The dresses that were selected for the banquets will be altered, and the dresses for the photo shoot will be pinned back just for the photographs. 
A few days before the photo shoot, the couple will meet with the photographer to discuss their preferences for the photographs. The photo shoot is a daylong event. The brides make up and hair is done and retouched or changed between each dress change. Taking the photos will take longer if the couple has requested to travel somewhere to get a scenic view. 
After the pictures are taken the couple later returns to the salon to select which photos they would like printed and in what size. The salon then retouches the images so they are perfect and then sends them off to be printed where they are again retouched to be perfect. After the photos are sent back to the salon where they are organized and framed. The couple then picks up their photographs and the process is completed.

Purpose
In Taiwanese culture the Bridal Photographs have multiple roles. Bridal photographs are a status symbol in Taiwanese culture. Things such as the backgrounds, the makeup and the quantity of bridal photos are a status symbol. The more bridal photographs that are displayed and the more albums a couple purchases is a sign of the couples and their family's wealth. The couple will display their bridal photographs multiple times. Displaying bridal photographs is a large deal in Taiwanese culture, regardless of wealth. The couple will display their large photographs at their wedding banquet and also will carry the albums of photos around so that all of their friends may look through them. After the festivities are over, the larger photographs will be hung up in the couple's living space. Many couples hang them over the beds. Taiwanese Bridal photographs also showcase the wife's youth. Taiwanese bridal photos are focused around the wife. They are a symbol of her youth and freedom that will soon disappear once she becomes a wife and starts living a married life style.

See also
 Cinema of Taiwan 
 Culture of Taiwan
 Chien-Chi Chang

References

External links
 Exposing Taiwan's celluloid
 The three swordsmen of Taiwan photography (Mandarin)
 "Chang Tsai Retrospective Photography Exhibition," Taipei Fine Arts Museum 
 "John Thomson & early photography in Taiwan," British photographic history,May 7, 2011
 "The Eyes of the Era Photographer Chang Chao-tang," Taiwan Panorama, January 2003
 "Image and Representation: Special Photo Collections of Taiwan during Japanese Colonial Era,"  Institute of Taiwan History, Academia Sinica, November 28, 2012
 "Images of colonial Taiwan are available free online," Duke University Libraries blog, October 1, 2009
 "The gloss of the new," Taipei Times, February 23, 2011
 "Document and Realist Photography from 1895 to 1948 during Taiwan's Colonial Period under Japanese Occupation," Dating-AU: Technology, Photography and Architecture 19th - 20th
 "The Hakka Images," Taiwan Review, June 1, 2012
 Example of Bridal Photography
 The Marriage Culture of Taiwan